Ibom Youths FC is a professional football club based in Ikot Ekpene, Akwa Ibom State, Nigeria.  

The club competes in the Nigeria National League.

History
The club was founded in 2016 by the Akwa Ibom State Government.

Stadium 
The Ikot Ekpene Township Stadium is home to the Ibom Youths FC team.

Current squad
As of February 2022, the club unveiled some new players who will feature in the ahead of the 2021/2022 season. Among them includes;
 David Essien
 Nsikak Moses
 Salami Damilola
 Mbuotidem Charles
 Franklin Chinedu
 Alexander Momoh
 Chibuzor Onyido
 Edidiong George
 Pius James
 Ekemini James
 Hosanna Uyoh
 Goodnews Paul
 Iniobong Bassey
 Udeme Markson
 Dauda Umar
 Bassey Edet

Former notable players
Ezekiel Edidiong

References

 
Football clubs in Nigeria
Akwa Ibom State
Sports clubs in Nigeria